Lyttle v Bluebird UK Bidco 2 Ltd(2015) C-182/13 is a UK labour law case, concerning the information and consultation in the European Union.

Facts
Employees of Bluebird Ltd, working at Woolworths shops, were dismissed. They claimed there was a failure to consult under CRD 1998 article (1)(a)(ii). Each shop had under 20 employees, and in none were more than 20 dismissed, which would trigger the duty to consult under the Trade Union and Labour Relations (Consolidation) Act 1992 section 188. The employees, represented by the union USDAW, argued the shops should collectively be deemed one establishment, so as to trigger the duty to consult.

The Northern Ireland Industrial Tribunal held a reference should be made to the European Court of Justice.

Judgment
The Court of Justice, Fifth Chamber held that an establishment was part of an undertaking, and did not need any legal, economic, financial, administrative of technological autonomy. It would be the entity to which workers were assigned to carry out duties under art 1(1)(a), since Athinaiki Chartopoiia AE v Panagiotidis (2007) C-270/05. The term should be interpreted the same under art 1(1)(a)(i) and (ii).

See also

UK labour law
Codetermination

Notes

References

United Kingdom labour case law